Kim Yoon-seok (born January 21, 1967) is a South Korean actor, film director and screenwriter. Kim began his career in theater and it subsequently led him to be cast in minor roles in films and television dramas.

His breakout role came as the villain in gambling film Tazza: The High Rollers (2006), but it was his performance as an ex-cop turned pimp in surprise hit The Chaser (2008) that brought him acting awards and wider recognition in his forties.

Kim has since become an acclaimed actor in South Korea, with notable performances in films such as Running Turtle (2009), The Yellow Sea (2010), Punch (2011),The Thieves (2012), Hwayi: A Monster Boy (2013), Sea Fog (2014), The Classified File (2015), The Priests (2015) and 1987: When the Day Comes (2017).

In 2019, Kim made his directorial debut with Another Child, a family drama film starring Yum Jung-ah and Kim So-jin.

Career
Kim Yoon-seok was trained on stage as a member of the renowned of Yeonwoo Theater Company (Yeonwoo Mudae),, and he made his acting debut in 1988 with A Streetcar Named Desire After many years in theater, he began acting in film and television late in his career, at first appearing in minor roles.

Then in 2006, Kim had his breakthrough in Choi Dong-hoon's Tazza: The High Rollers, with audiences praising his performance in the supporting role as ruthless gambler Agwi (meaning "starving demon" in Buddhism). A leading role followed in 2008 with The Chaser, directed by Na Hong-jin. He successfully portrayed the morally ambiguous character of a retired-cop-turned-pimp hunting down a serial killer who murdered the call girls due to his impotence. The thriller was a critical and commercial hit, becoming one of the classic films in thriller genre, and Kim's excellent performance brought him 8 awards totally, made him a major player in the Korean film industry.

He transitioned from one of the finest character actors in the industry into a popular leading actor: Kim played a middle-aged man following his lifelong dream to play in a rock band in The Happy Life, a rural detective trying to capture a legendary prison breaker in Running Turtle, and a rival Taoist wizard in Jeon Woo-chi.

In 2010, Kim reunited with The Chaser costar Ha Jung-woo in Na's sophomore film The Yellow Sea. 
Kim then costarred with Yoo Ah-in in coming-of-age film Punch, a critically and commercial hit.

Kim once again triumphed in 2012, as his heist movie The Thieves became the second best-selling Korean film of all time.

In 2013, he continued working with one of Korea's leading directors, in Yim Soon-rye's family drama film South Bound. He then starred in Hwayi: A Monster Boy, an action thriller directed by Jang Joon-hwan. In 2014, Kim starred in the critically acclaimed arthouse film Sea Fog directed by Shim Sung-bo.

In 2015, Kim collaborated with director Kwak Kyung-taek in The Classified File., playing a detective cooperating with a shaman to find out and save a kidnapped girl. Kim then reunited with Kang Dong-won in The Priests, a supernatural mystery thriller by director Jang Jae-hyun. The Priests was a box office hit, attracting 5.44 million admissions to cinema. Kim then made a brief appearance in retro film C'est Si Bon by Kim Hyun-seok, playing a middle-aged man retrospecting his youth in 1980s.
In 2016, Kim starred in romance film Will You Be There?, directed by Hong Ji-young, based on the novel of the same name of Guillaume Musso. Kim portrayed a middle-aged pediatric whose last wish before death was to see his first love once again.
 
In 2017, Kim starred in director Hwang Dong-hyuk's historical film The Fortress. He also reunited with director Jang Joon-hwan in 1987: When the Day Comes, another historical political film about pro-democratic movement in South Korea in 1987.

In 2018, Kim starred in murder mystery film Dark Figure of Crime. He reportedly worked on the script alongside director Kwak Kyung-taek. In 2019, Kim made his directorial debut with Another Child, a family drama film.

In October 2022, Kim signed with new agency Hodu&U Entertainment.

Personal life
Kim was born in Danyang County, North Chungcheong Province but grew up in Busan, then moved to Seoul for acting career.

He married actress Bang Joo-ran in 2002, and has 2 daughters.

Filmography

Film

Television series

Web series

Theater

Awards and nominations

State honors

Notes

References

External links

 
Kim Yoon-seuk at Naver 

People from North Chungcheong Province
South Korean male film actors
South Korean male stage actors
South Korean male television actors
1967 births
Living people
20th-century South Korean male actors
21st-century South Korean male actors
Dong-Eui University alumni
Gimhae Kim clan